Ralph Chapman (26 January 1906 – March 1999) was an English professional footballer who played as an outside forward. He played ten matches in the Football League for Nelson.

References

1906 births
1999 deaths
Footballers from Salford
English footballers
Association football forwards
Nelson F.C. players
English Football League players